Jeffrey Gerard Klepacki (born December 17, 1968 in Kearny, New Jersey) is an American rower. He represented the United States in the Olympics (1992, 1996 and 2000).  Klepacki led the US Heavyweight 8+ to the gold medal in the world rowing championships in 1994 and again won World Championship gold medals in the Heavyweight 8+ in 1998 and 1999. Klepacki grew up in Kearny, New Jersey and started rowing while attending Kearny High School. He then attended Rutgers University.

References

1968 births
Living people
Kearny High School (New Jersey) alumni
People from Kearny, New Jersey
Sportspeople from Hudson County, New Jersey
Rutgers University alumni
Olympic rowers of the United States
Rowers at the 1992 Summer Olympics
Rowers at the 1996 Summer Olympics
Rowers at the 2000 Summer Olympics
World Rowing Championships medalists for the United States
American male rowers
Pan American Games medalists in rowing
Pan American Games gold medalists for the United States
Rowers at the 1995 Pan American Games
Medalists at the 1995 Pan American Games